César Ferioli Pelaez (born 22 July 1959) is a Spanish comic book artist. He is best known for his Mickey Mouse comics, which are primarily inspired by Floyd Gottfredson's classic newspaper strip stories with Mickey Mouse. Since 1989, Ferioli has worked for the Danish Disney publisher Egmont.

One of his best-known works is the 2003 series Mythos Island, written by Pat and Carol McGreal and Per Erik Hedman.

References

External links 

Cèsar Ferioli at the Lambiek Comiclopedia

1959 births
Living people
Italian comics artists
Spanish comics artists
Disney comics artists
Artists from Barcelona
20th-century Spanish artists